The Southern Suburbs Tatler is a local newspaper in the Southern Suburbs region of Cape Town, Western Cape, South Africa. Its coverage area includes Woodstock, Observatory, Mowbray, Rondebosch, Rondebosch East, Newlands, Claremont, Pinelands, Kenilworth and Bishopscourt.

References

External links
 Cape Community Newspapers

Weekly newspapers published in South Africa
Mass media in Cape Town